Danish Crusade may refer to:

Siege of Arkona of 1168, part of the Northern Crusades
Danish Crusade of 1191 to Finland
Danish Crusade of 1202 to Finland, led by Anders Sunesen
Danish Crusade of 1206 to Ösel (Saaremaa), see Livonian Crusade#War against Saaremaa (1206–61)
Danish Crusade of 1219 to Estonia, see Battle of Lyndanisse